Maurice Lalonde (24 August 1901 – 2 June 1956) was a Liberal Party member of the House of Commons of Canada. He was born in Montreal, Quebec, and became a lawyer by career.

The son of Wilfrid Lalonde and Blanche L'Archevèque, Lalonde attended Mont Laurier St. Joseph Seminary where he attained a Bachelor of Arts degree, then the Université de Montréal for law studies and then formally became a lawyer in 1927. He also owned the publication La Voix du Nord and served as president of the companies Mont-Laurier Aviation and Lievre Lumber. Lalonde practised law in Mont-Laurier.

He was first elected to Parliament at the Labelle riding in the 1935 general election and re-elected in 1940 and 1945. Lalonde did not seek another term at the 1949 election.

His son Fernand served in the Quebec National Assembly.

References

1901 births
1956 deaths
Lawyers from Montreal
Liberal Party of Canada MPs
Members of the House of Commons of Canada from Quebec
Politicians from Montreal